Placida aoteana is a species of minute sea slug, a marine opisthobranch gastropod mollusk or micromollusk in the family Limapontiidae.

References

 MolluscaBase eds. (2022). MolluscaBase. Placida aoteana (Powell, 1937). Accessed through: World Register of Marine Species at: https://www.marinespecies.org/aphia.php?p=taxdetails&id=548856 on 2022-01-22
 Spencer, H.G., Marshall, B.A. & Willan, R.C. (2009). Checklist of New Zealand living Mollusca. Pp 196-219. in: Gordon, D.P. (ed.) New Zealand inventory of biodiversity. Volume one. Kingdom Animalia: Radiata, Lophotrochozoa, Deuterostomia. Canterbury University Press.

Limapontiidae
Gastropods described in 1937

 Chichvarkhin A.Yu., Ekimova I.A., Chalenko K.P., Schepetov D., Chichvarkhina O.V. & Valdés Á.A. (2016). Placida babai (Mollusca: Gastropoda: Sacoglossa) from Russian waters of the Sea of Japan. The Bulletin of the Russian Far East Malacological Society. 20(1): 44-56